The  was a group of around 62 samurai of the Nihonmatsu Domain, aged between 12 and 17, who fought in the Boshin War.

History 
Although the roster lists 62 members, a subset of 20 remain famous due to their naming in the unsuccessful defence of Nihonmatsu Castle in 1868, under the command of Kimura Jūtarō. Sixteen of these, including Kimura, died in the defence.

See also 
・Nihonmatsu Castle

・Byakkotai(百虎隊)

References

External links
Extended information about the Nihonmatsu Shonentai in Japanese

Culture in Fukushima Prefecture
People of the Boshin War
Japanese warriors
Meiji Restoration